Vasilios Botinos (19 October 1944 – 16 February 2022) was a Greek footballer who played as a winger for Olympiacos as well as the Greece national team.

Career
Born in Volos, Botinos began playing football as a winger with Olympiakos Volou F.C. in 1958, until he joined Alpha Ethniki side Olympiacos F.C. in July 1964. He spent most of his career with Olympiacos, where he suffered a serious leg injury in 1969. Botinos left Olympiacos for Panegialios F.C. in 1972, and finished his career in the Alpha Ethniki with Panionios G.S.S., retiring at age 29 in 1974.

Botinos made twelve appearances and scored three goals for the Greece national team from 1967 to 1969, scoring two goals in a 4–1 1970 FIFA World Cup qualifying victory against Switzerland on 15 October 1969.

Personal life
Botinos died from COVID-19 in Nice, France, on 16 February 2022, at the age of 77.

References

1944 births
2022 deaths
Footballers from Volos
Greek footballers
Association football wingers
Greece international footballers
Olympiacos Volos F.C. players
Olympiacos F.C. players
Panionios F.C. players
Panegialios F.C. players
Deaths from the COVID-19 pandemic in France